Fiji Bitter is one of the many beers manufactured in Fiji by Paradise Beverages (Fiji) Limited, a subsidiary of Coca-Cola Amatil and is one of Fiji's most popular beers.

See also

References

External links
 

Beer brands in Fiji
Beer in Fiji
Foster's Group
1958 establishments in Fiji